Samia Gore is an American author and entrepreneur. She is the founder of Body Complete Rx headquartered in Reston, Virginia.

Early life and education 
Gore was born and raised in Detroit, Michigan. She attended Southfield High School, class of 1999. She completed her bachelor’s degree in sociology at Eastern Michigan University and earned her master's degree from Central Michigan University in business.

Career 
Following graduation, Gore worked as a human resource manager for the United States Department of Veterans Affairs.

In 2017, Gore founded Body Complete Rx, a wellness brand featuring plant-based nutritional supplements that support weight management. As of 2021, the company has grossed over $10 million in sales. 

In May 2021, Body Complete Rx announced the launch of its products through The Vitamin Shoppe’s starting on August 1, 2021. 

Gore is a recipient of Inc.'s 2021 Top 100 Female Entrepreneurs to watch.

Personal life 
Gore has 4 children; Amirah Wiley, Harmony Wiley, Sincere Wiley, and Carter Gore.

Works 

 Plastica: Step By Step Guide To Plastic Surgery Paperback (2016)

References

External links 
 

Living people
American women company founders
American company founders
American women writers
Year of birth missing (living people)
Businesspeople from Detroit
Southfield High School alumni
Eastern Michigan University alumni
Central Michigan University alumni
21st-century American women